Aurapex is a monotypic genus of fungi within the family Cryphonectriaceae containing the sole species Aurapex penicillata.

External links

Diaporthales
Monotypic fungi genera